Fossarina patula is a species of very small sea snail, a marine gastropod mollusc or micromollusk in the family Trochidae, the top snails.

Description
The shell grows to a length of 6 mm. The shell is widely umbilicated, with alternate larger and smaller tuberculated spiral ribs. The ribs are simple on the base. The umbilicus is acutely carinate-margined. The shell is whitish, sparsely maculated with dark brown. The three whorls are convex. The outer lip is ascending posteriorly.

Distribution 
This marine species is endemic to Australia and occurs off New South Wales, Tasmania and Victoria

References

Adams, S. & Angas, G.F. 1863. Descriptions of new species from Australian seas, in the collection of George French Angas. Proceedings of the Zoological Society of London 1863(III): 418-428, pl. xxxvii
Angas, G.F. 1871. Descriptions of thirty-four new species of shells from Australia. Proceedings of the Zoological Society of London 1871: 13-20
Tenison-Woods, J.E. 1881. On some new marine Mollusca. Transactions and Proceedings of the Royal Society of Victoria 17: 80-83
Whitelegge, T. 1889. List of the Marine and Freshwater Invertebrate Fauna of Port Jackson and the Neighbourhood. Journal and Proceedings of the Royal Society of New South Wales 23: 1-161
Henn, A.U. & Brazier, J.W. 1894. List of Mollusca found at Green Point, Watson's Bay, Sydney. With a few remarks upon some of the most interesting species and descriptions of new species. Proceedings of the Linnean Society of New South Wales 2 9: 165-182
Tate, R. & May, W.L. 1901. A revised census of the marine Mollusca of Tasmania. Proceedings of the Linnean Society of New South Wales 26(3): 344-471
Kesteven, H.L. 1902. The systematic position of the genus Fossarina, A.Adams and Angas, and of Fossarina varia, Hutton. Records of the Australian Museum 4(7): 317-322
Pritchard, G.B. & Gatliff, J.H. 1902. Catalogue of the marine shells of Victoria. Part V. Proceedings of the Royal Society of Victoria 14(2): 85-138
Hedley, C. 1918. A checklist of the marine fauna of New South Wales. Part 1. Journal and Proceedings of the Royal Society of New South Wales 51: M1-M120
Iredale, T. & McMichael, D.F. 1962. A reference list of the marine Mollusca of New South Wales. Memoirs of the Australian Museum 11: 1-109
Wilson, B. 1993. Australian Marine Shells. Prosobranch Gastropods. Kallaroo, Western Australia : Odyssey Publishing Vol. 1 408 pp.

External links

patula
Gastropods of Australia
Gastropods described in 1863